The 2017 Spokane Empire season was the second season for the professional indoor football franchise in the Indoor Football League (IFL). The Empire were one of ten teams that competed in the IFL for the 2017 season and were members of the Intense Conference.

Led by head coach Adam Shackleford, the Empire played their home games at Spokane Veterans Memorial Arena in Spokane, Washington. After the season, the team ceased operations.

Roster changes

Free agents

Signings

Staff

Schedule
Key:

Regular season
All start times are local time

Standings

Roster

References

External links
Spokane Empire official statistics 

Spokane Empire
Spokane Empire
Spokane Empire